The Blade is a 1995 Hong Kong martial arts film co-written, produced and directed by Tsui Hark, starring Vincent Zhao, Moses Chan, Hung Yan-yan, Song Lei, Austin Wai, Chung Bik-ha and Valerie Chow. This film is notable for its unusual style, which includes dramatic close-ups, employment of colour gels, and frenetic camera use during the fight sequences.

Plot
Ding-on is an orphaned blacksmith working in Sharp Foundry, which is run by his master, a friend of his deceased father. The master's daughter, Ling, who narrates the movie, is romantically attracted to both Ding-on and his colleague, Iron Head. One day, Ding-on and Iron Head see a monk fending off a group of thugs, who later ambush and kill him in revenge. Iron Head is so furious that he identifies himself as someone from Sharp Foundry and taunts the thugs to fight him. The master is angry when he hears of Iron Head's reckless behaviour so he punishes him. Iron Head holds a grudge against Ding-on for telling their master about the incident. He becomes even more unhappy when their master announces his decision to make Ding-on his successor.

That night, Ding-on overhears a conversation between Ling and her grandmother, and learns that his father died while saving Ling's father from Flying Dragon, a notorious heavily-tattooed assassin. Ding-on desires to seek revenge so he takes his father's weapon, a broken sword (the titular Blade), and bids his master farewell. Ling tries to catch up with him but runs into trouble with the thugs. Ding-on hears Ling's screams for help and returns to save her. He fights with the thugs but loses his right arm and falls off a cliff.

Ding-on is saved and nursed back to health by a peasant called Blackie. Seeing that he is now crippled, Ding-on abandons his quest for vengeance, buries his father's sword, and tries to lead a normal life with Blackie. At the same time, Ling and Iron Head venture out in search of Ding-on, whom they believe to be still alive. During this period of time, Ling gradually becomes more disillusioned with life and people, especially after she witnesses Iron Head taking advantage of a prostitute whom he saved earlier.

Meanwhile, Ding-on endures humiliation while working in a restaurant. One day, he sees Flying Dragon and feels very frustrated because he can no longer take revenge. One night, a gang of bandits burn down his house, tie him upside-down, and beat him mercilessly. Later, Blackie finds a martial arts manual hidden by her parents and passes it to Ding-on. Ding-on becomes excited and tries to learn the techniques in the book, but cannot afford a good weapon so he uses his father's broken sword. Owing to his handicap and the book's incompleteness, Ding-on's efforts turn out to be futile initially. However, when driven to rage by his frustration, he suddenly makes a breakthrough and develops a devastating spinning movement which allows him to compensate for his lack of an arm and his broken weapon.

Ding-on kills the bandits who burnt down his house and saves Ling from danger but does not reveal himself to her. At the same time, an evil man called Skeleton recruits Flying Dragon to help him destroy Sharp Foundry and kill everyone there. A battle breaks out between Flying Dragon and Sharp Foundry's blacksmiths. While his master is struggling to defend himself, Ding-on returns in the nick of time to save his master, and he kills Flying Dragon after a long fight. Skeleton and his men flee after seeing that Flying Dragon is dead. Ding-on then turns his back on Sharp Foundry and leaves with Blackie. In the final scene, an aged Ling imagines herself embracing Ding-on and returning to the happier times in the past.

Cast

 Vincent Zhao as Ding-on
 Moses Chan as Iron Head
 Hung Yan-yan as Flying Dragon
 Song Lei as Ling
 Suet Nei as Older Ling
 Austin Wai as Ling's father
 Chung Bik-ha as Blackie
 Valerie Chow as prostitute
 Michael Tse as Skeleton
 Chan Wing-chung as monk
 Chin Tsi-ang as Ling's grandmother
 Szema Wah Lung as Uncle Wah
 Yuen Bun as bandit chief
 Collin Chou as Fast Saber

Reception
In 2014, Time Out polled several film critics, directors, actors and stunt actors to list their top action films, and The Blade was ranked 43rd on the list. In 2009 Quentin Tarantino named The Blade one of his Top 20 favorite films released in the past 17 years.

Availability
 Warner Archive released the film on DVD in 2016.

References

External links 
 
 
 

1995 films
Hong Kong action films
Films directed by Tsui Hark
1990s action films
Kung fu films
1990s Cantonese-language films
1990s Hong Kong films